Muhammad Haikal bin Mohamad Nazri (born 16 February 1993) is a Malaysian footballer who plays as a left winger for Malaysia M3 League club  Langkawi Glory United.

Club career

Kelantan
Haikal made his league debut for Kelantan in 2–1 defeat to Melaka United on 3 February 2018.

Career statistics

Club

References

External links
 

Living people
1993 births
Malaysian footballers
Sportspeople from Kuala Lumpur
Negeri Sembilan FA players
Kelantan FA players
Real Mulia F.C. players
Felcra FC players
Malaysia Super League players
Association football midfielders
Malaysian people of Malay descent